I Love Liberty was an American musical and dramatic television special, broadcast in 1982. It was a patriotic variety show, billed as a "salute to freedom"; guests included Dionne Warwick, Desi Arnaz Jr., Patty Duke, Jane Fonda, Burt Lancaster, Walter Matthau, Mary Tyler Moore, and Barbra Streisand.

The show was created and presented by the screenwriter and producer Norman Lear.

This features a music video of Barbra Streisand's "America, The Beautiful" in this special.

References 

1982 television specials
1982 in American television